Ajda '93 is Turkish pop singer Ajda Pekkan's fourteenth studio album, which was released on 17 May 1993 in Turkey.

Track listing

References

External links 

 

Ajda Pekkan albums
1993 albums
Turkish-language albums